In basketball, a steal is the act of legally gaining possession of the ball by a defensive player who causes the opponent to turn the ball over. The National Collegiate Athletic Association's (NCAA) Division I steal title is awarded to the player with the highest steals per game average in a given season. The steal title was first recognized in the 1985–86 season when statistics on steals were first compiled by the NCAA.

Desmond Cambridge of Alabama A&M holds the all-time NCAA Division I records for single-season steals (160) and steals per game (5.52), which both occurred during the 2001–02 season. The all-time leader in career steals is Richmond's Jacob Gilyard (466), who benefited from the NCAA's blanket COVID-19 eligibility waiver which allowed all student-athletes who were active in 2020–21 to play a full additional season without penalty.

In 2011–12, two 'firsts' occurred: Jay Threatt of Delaware State became the first ever repeat season steals leader, and there was also a tie for the honor (Fuquan Edwin of Seton Hall tied Threatt with a 3.00 steals per game average). When Chavis Holmes of Virginia Military Institute (VMI) secured his national steals title in 2008–09 at 3.39 spg, he and his brother Travis became the first pair of siblings in NCAA basketball history to lead the nation in the same statistical category. Travis had led the country with a 3.36 spg average in 2006–07. Only two schools have had two different players win the steals title: Alabama A&M (2002, 2005) and VMI (2007, 2009). The lowest steals total for a national per game leader is 78, and the lowest steals per game average to win is 2.83, both of which were achieved by Threatt.

Three freshmen have led the nation in steals: Jason Kidd (1993), Joel Hoover (1997), and Devin Gibson (2008). Among them, Kidd tallied the highest steals per game average (3.79) and the most total steals (110). He would also go on to lead the NCAA in assists the following season as a sophomore.

Key

Steals leaders

References
General

Specific

NCAA Division I men's basketball statistical leaders